The Margin (French: La Marge) is a novel by André Pieyre de Mandiargues published in 1967, which won the Prix Goncourt the same year. It was first published in the UK as The Margin in 1970, translated by R. Howard.

The novel was adapted to film in 1976 directed by Walerian Borowczyk as La Marge, internationally as The Margin and in the UK as The Streetwalker.

Editions 
La Marge, Éditions Gallimard, Paris, 1967.
The Margin, J Calder (January 29, 1970).

References

1967 French novels
French novels adapted into films
Prix Goncourt winning works
Éditions Gallimard books